Tyranx (died 528) was a Hun general and sub-king, or king of a Hunnish tribe, fighting for the Sasanian Empire.

Biography
He was a king of a section of the Huns. In the late 520s, he became an ally of Persian king Kavad I. He fought for him against the queen of fellow Hunnish tribe Sabirs, a woman named Boa (Boarez/Boarek), the widow of Balaq. As he was marching with fellow Hun king Glom to the aid of the Persians, who were fighting the Romans, he was defeated by Boa, captured, and sent in chains to Justinian, who executed him near the Church of St. Conon, located in the Blachernae on the bank of the Golden Horn.

Etymology
His name is thought to be of Turkic origin.

References

Sources

528 deaths
Hun military leaders
Persian people of Hunnic descent
Huns from the Sasanian Empire